Hidden Treasures Fanta Miss Nepal 2013, the 16th Miss Nepal beauty pageant, was held on March 20, 2013 at the Nepal Academy Hall in Kathmandu. Miss Nepal 2012 Shristi Shrestha crowned her successor Ishani Shrestha as Miss Nepal World 2013, she represented Nepal at Miss World 2013 pageant. Rojisha Shahi was chosen as Miss Nepal Earth 2013 and was sent to Miss Earth 2013 competition. Shritima Shah was chosen as Miss Nepal International 2013 and she represented Nepal for  Miss International 2013 pageant.

According to the press conference the winner of Miss Nepal 2013 was selected as the brand ambassador of the drink Fanta, WWF Nepal for a year, and received Rs 50,000. 
All three winners received a Samsung phone and an apartment at Suncity apartments by Shangrila. The auditions of Miss Nepal were held in various cities including Pokhara, Butwal, Biratnagar, Narayangad and Kathmandu resulting in 18 chosen finalists from different cities. These 18 shortlisted young women aged 19 years and above competed for the main title and the pageant was telecast live on Nepal Television.

Results

Color keys

Sub-titles

Contestants

Previous Experience
 (#3) Sipora Gurung is a National level volleyball player.
 (#4) Bindu KC previously competed in Miss Nepal 2010.
 (#8) Meghna Shrestha was previously 1st runner up to Miss Teen College 2009.
 (#10) Pratima Giri worked as VJ at Play it On show on the NTV PLUS.
 (#11) Oshima Banu won Face of the Classic Diamond for Timeless Paragon Jewellery 2012.
 (#12) Rakshya Thapa was previously Miss Siglakas 2010 and 1st runner up to Miss VMUF 2009.
 (#14) Ashmita Sitoula was previously Top 5 in Miss Teen Nepal 2011.
 (#15) Sumi Moktan won Miss Tamang 2012.
 (#18) Riju Shrestha was Top 5 in Miss Nepal Global 2012.

References

3: http://www.sathiz.com/ninja/miss-nepal-2013/332 (Miss Nepal 2013 News)

External links
 Winning moment, HD Video of the final program
 Miss Nepal Official Website
 Miss Nepal 2013 going to happen in 15 March 2013
  Miss Nepal 2013 Views and Contestant
  Miss Nepal 2013 Date & Venue
 Ishani Shrestha : Miss Nepal World 2013 :  Miss World 2013 Contestant
Ishani Shrestha : Miss Nepal World 2013

Beauty pageants in Nepal
2013 in Nepal
Miss Nepal